Pro-Life (born Marvin Thomas Richardson; August 5, 1941) is an American perennial candidate and strawberry farmer known for his strong opposition to abortion, which inspired him to legally change his name. He lives in the unincorporated community of Letha, Idaho. He has made several unsuccessful runs for political office in Idaho and has stated his intention to continue running for office until his death. Pro-Life ran in the 2020 United States House of Representatives elections in Idaho, receiving 2.2% of the vote, and was most recently the Constitution Party nominee in the 2022 Idaho lieutenant gubernatorial election, receiving 5.1%.

Early life and education
Born Marvin Thomas Richardson, Pro-Life was born in Carbon County, Wyoming to a Latter Day Saint family. He played basketball in high school and attended Brigham Young University on an athletic scholarship but was eventually cut from the varsity basketball team. He graduated from BYU in 1967 with a degree in political science after serving as an LDS missionary in Arizona, California, and Nevada.

Pro-Life has worked as an organic farmer since 2002, mainly farming strawberries. He has previously worked as an accountant, coal miner, and salesman of irrigation equipment and Caterpillar parts.

Career

Campaigns 
As Marvin Richardson, Pro-Life first ran for public office in 2004, when he challenged Republican Kathy Skippen for a seat in the Idaho House of Representatives. Skippen won 78% to 22%.

Having legally changed his middle name to "Pro-Life" in 2004, Richardson filed for the 2006 Idaho governor's race as Marvin Pro-Life Richardson. The Idaho Secretary of State's office would not allow Richardson to appear on the ballot with his new middle name, although he could be listed as Marvin P. Richardson. Secretary of State Ben Ysursa said, "We've made it clear to him since March we were not going to put 'pro-life' on the ballot, and that's still our position. The ballot is not supposed to be a forum for political expression—it's supposed to be as neutral as it can be." Richardson was invited to participate in the 2006 gubernatorial debate, but did not respond to his invitation in time. Initially, Richardson was the Constitution Party's candidate in the 2006 gubernatorial election, but the Constitution Party of Idaho disavowed him. That year, he had his name changed to simply "Pro-Life," but still appeared as Marvin Richardson on the ballot. In the election, he received 1.62 percent of the vote, behind Democrat Jerry Brady and the winner, Republican Butch Otter.

In 2008, Pro-Life ran as an independent for the United States Senate seat being vacated by Larry Craig. That year, he was allowed to appear on the ballot as "Pro-Life". The executive director of an Idaho anti-abortion group expressed concern that voters would mistake Pro-Life's name on the ballot for a position rather than a candidate. Such fears led to a qualifier next to Pro-Life's name on the ballot: "(A person, formerly known as Marvin Richardson)". He has appeared thus on all subsequent Idaho ballots. He received 1.34 percent of the votes in the race, behind Libertarian Kent Marmon, independent Rex Rammell, Democrat Larry LaRocco, and the winner, Republican Jim Risch.

In 2010, Pro-Life ran for governor for a second time. He came in fifth in the race, behind Libertarian Ted Dunlap, independent Jana Kemp, Democrat Keith Allred, and the winner, Republican Butch Otter.

Pro-Life was a candidate for Idaho's 1st congressional district in the United States Congress in 2012. He ran against incumbent Republican Raúl Labrador and Democrat Jimmy Farris. According to  OpenSecrets, Pro-Life's 2012 campaign was entirely self-financed. The incumbent won the race.

Pro-Life ran a third campaign for Governor of Idaho in the 2014 gubernatorial election.

Pro-Life ran for the Senate again in 2016. He was defeated in the Constitution Party primary on May 17, 2016 by Ray J. Writz.

Political views
Pro-Life has said he believes that abortion is murder, and he supports charging doctors who perform abortions with murder.

He opposed the Troubled Asset Relief Program as a candidate in 2008, citing concerns that its implementation would result in "a total fascist dictatorship run by the bankers." He opposes war undertaken without a declaration of war by Congress; he supports a non-interventionist foreign policy and considers the wars in Iraq, Afghanistan, and Libya to be unjust and unconstitutional. He also opposes public education, which he considers to be communist. After the Sandy Hook Elementary School shooting, he suggested allowing Idaho sheriffs to organize groups of armed volunteers to protect schools.

Personal life
Pro-Life is a vegetarian. As Marvin Richardson, he married Jean Benson in 1964; they divorced in 1982.

He has been married to Kirsten Faith since 1982. In 2006, she ran for the Idaho House of Representatives as the Constitution Party nominee against Republican Steven Thayn, receiving 3,026 votes (24.56%). Pro-Life encouraged her to run for this position, despite their conviction that women should not work outside the home.

Pro-Life has 15 children, seven from his previous wife, and eight from his current wife.

Formerly a member of the Church of Jesus Christ of Latter-day Saints, Pro-Life left the church in 1998, based on false claims that the church does not ascribe personhood to the unborn.

Electoral history

Idaho House of Representatives (2004)

Governor of Idaho (2006, 2010, 2014)

U.S. Senate (2008)

U.S. House of Representatives (2012, 2020)

See also
 Seán Dublin Bay Rockall Loftus—an Irish politician who changed his name to reflect his political views
 Cesar Chavez (perennial candidate)

References

Further reading

External links
Official website
Pro-Life at Project Vote Smart
 from PoliticIt

1941 births
Living people
20th-century Christians
20th-century Mormon missionaries
21st-century American politicians
21st-century Christians
American accountants
American anti-abortion activists
American men's basketball players
American Mormon missionaries in the United States
Brigham Young University alumni
BYU Cougars men's basketball players
Farmers from Idaho
Former Latter Day Saints
Idaho Constitutionalists
Idaho Independents
Non-interventionism
People from Carbon County, Wyoming
People from Gem County, Idaho
Republican Party (United States) politicians
American anti-communists
Idaho Republicans
Right-wing populism in the United States